Adam Rufer (born September 3, 1991) is a Czech professional ice hockey player. He is currently playing with HC Oceláři Třinec of the Czech Extraliga.

Rufer made his Czech Extraliga debut playing with HC Oceláři Třinec during the 2011–12 Czech Extraliga season.

References

External links

1991 births
Living people
Czech ice hockey forwards
HC Oceláři Třinec players
Place of birth missing (living people)
Sportspeople from Třinec
Hokej Šumperk 2003 players
HC Frýdek-Místek players
TH Unia Oświęcim players
VHK Vsetín players
Stadion Hradec Králové players
Czech expatriate ice hockey people
Czech expatriate sportspeople in Poland
Expatriate ice hockey players in Poland